Oskar is a 1962 Danish comedy film based upon the play by ,  directed by Gabriel Axel and starring .

Cast 
  as chauffeur
 Vera Gebuhr as Charlotte
 Judy Gringer as Tina
 Lone Hertz as Vibeke Bang
 Ebbe Langberg as Oskar
 Ghita Nørby as Eva Hansen
 Dirch Passer as Martin Kristiansen
 Birgitte Reimer as Mona Bang
 Ove Sprogøe as Bernhard Bang
 Axel Strøbye as Egon Larsen

References

External links 
 
 

1962 films
1962 comedy films
Danish comedy films
1960s Danish-language films
Films directed by Gabriel Axel